The seventh-day Sabbatarians observe and re-stablish the Old Testament Sabbath commandment, including observances running from Friday sunset to Saturday sunset, similar to Jews and the early Christians. Many of these groups observe the Sabbath by picking up practices from modern Rabbinic Judaism.

List of churches and movements
 Sabbatarian Baptists
 Seventh Day Baptists
 Sabbatarian Adventists
 Adventist Church of Promise
 Churches of God (Seventh-Day)
 Creation Seventh Day Adventist Church
 Sabbath Rest Advent Church
 Seventh-day Adventist Church
 Seventh Day Adventist Reform Movement
 International Missionary Society of Seventh-Day Adventist Church Reform Movement
 True and Free Seventh-day Adventists
 Shepherd's Rod (Davidian Seventh-day Adventists)
 United Sabbath-Day Adventist Church
 United Seventh-Day Brethren
 Sabbatarian Pentecostalists
 Nazareth Baptist Church
 Sabbatarian Pentecostalists, Ukraine, Oneness denomination, formed in the 1920s–1930s in the Western Ukraine, Poland
 Soldiers of the Cross Church
 True Jesus Church
 Sabbatarian British Israelites / (Armstrongism)
 Church of God: A Worldwide Association (COGWA)
 Church of God International (United States)
 Church of the Great God
 Church of God Preparing for the Kingdom of God
 Global Church of God 
 House of Yahweh 
 Intercontinental Church of God
 Living Church of God
 Philadelphia Church of God
 Restored Church of God 
 United Church of God
 Judaizers
 Assemblies of Yahweh
 Black Hebrew Israelites
 African Hebrew Israelites of Jerusalem
 Church of God and Saints of Christ
 Church of God and Saints of Christ (Orthodox Christianity)
 Commandment Keepers
 Hebrew Roots Movement
 Makuya
 Messianic Judaism, some Messianic Jews observe Shabbat on Saturdays
 Sacred Name Movement
 Yahweh's Assembly in Yahshua
 Subbotniks, the majority belonged to Rabbinic and Karaite Judaism, the minority to Christianity
 Yehowists, a Russian Spiritual Christian millenarian movement founded in the 1840s
 Others
 Church of Christ (Fettingite)
 The Christ's Assembly
 Church of Israel
 Church of Jesus Christ of Latter Day Saints (Strangite)
 House of Aaron
 Evangelical Association of the Israelite Mission of the New Universal Covenant (AEMINPU)
 Jemaat Allah Global Indonesia (JAGI), internationally known as Unitarian Christian Church of Indonesia (UCCI), headquartered in Semarang, Central Java, Indonesia
 Remnant Fellowship, headquartered in Brentwood, Tennessee and founded in 1999 by Gwen Shamblin Lara
 The Seventh-day Remnant Church
 World Mission Society Church of God
 Free Presbyterian Church of Scotland
 Ancient Foundations Bible Fellowship, Port Macquarie
 Founded in Truth Fellowship

References

Lists of Christian denominations